Michael Makepeace Thackeray  is a South African chemist and battery materials researcher. He is mainly known for his work on electrochemically active cathode materials.  In the mid-1980s he co-discovered the manganese oxide spinel family of cathodes for lithium ion batteries while working in the lab of John Goodenough at the University of Oxford. In 1998, while at Argonne National Laboratory, he led a team that first reported the NMC cathode technology. Patent protection around the concept and materials were first issued in 2005 to Argonne National Laboratory to a team with Thackeray, Khalil Amine, Jaekook Kim, and Christopher Johnson. The reported invention is now widely used in consumer electronics and electric vehicles.

Career 
Thackeray obtained his M.Sc and Ph.D. in Chemistry at the University of Cape Town, South Africa. After University, he worked for the South African  CSIR research organization from 1973 to 1977 as a researcher in the National Physical Research Laboratory in Pretoria. From 1981-82, as well as in 1985, he worked with John Goodenough at the University of Oxford. In 1983 Thackeray returned to CSIR as Group Leader of the Ceramics Division and in 1988 was named a Research Manager in the Battery Technology Unit. In 1994, Thackeray moved to the Chemical Technology Division at Argonne National Laboratory in the United States, where he was named Group Leader of the Battery Materials Group within the Electrochemical Energy Storage Department. He was the founding director of the Center for Electrochemical Energy Science (CEES), a DOE Energy Frontier Research Center, where he oversaw research to understand lithium-air storage chemistry, polymerized cathode coatings, and cathode surface stability. He retired in 2019.

Thackeray has more than 180 publications, and he holds more than 25 patents.

He was elected a Fellow of the Royal Society in 2022.

References

External links
 Michael Thackeray, Argonne experts page, Retrieved am 17.05.2012
 Announcement of Hydro-Québec and Technifin, Retrieved 17.05.2012

Year of birth missing (living people)
Living people
Fellows of the Royal Society
Academics of the University of Oxford
South African chemists
Argonne National Laboratory people
University of Cape Town alumni